Lorenzo Bandini (21 December 193510 May 1967) was an Italian motor racing driver who raced in Formula One for the Scuderia Centro Sud and Ferrari teams.

Career
Bandini was born in Barce in Cyrenaica, Libya, which was then an Italian colony. The family returned to Italy in 1939 and resided near Florence. His father died when he was 15. Bandini left home and found a job as an apprentice mechanic in the Freddi workshop in Milan.

He made his way into auto racing from competing on motorcycles. He started racing cars in 1957 in a borrowed Fiat 1100. Goliardo Freddi, acknowledging Bandini's talent, decided to support him. Bandini would later marry Freddi's daughter, Margherita, in 1963, and remained involved with the family's garage in Milan.

He achieved a first class victory at the Mille Miglia, in a Lancia Appia Zagato, in 1958, and a class win the same year in the 500cc Berkeley in the 12-hour race at Monza. He then raced in Formula Junior until 1961. Bandini purchased a Volpini Formula Junior car and placed third in his first race in Sicily. In 1959 and 1960 he drove a Formula Junior Stanguellini. In 1960 he placed fourth in the Formula Junior World Championship.

In 1961 Bandini and fellow Italian driver Giancarlo Baghetti were both in contention for a seat at Ferrari. Ferrari opted for Baghetti, and Bandini went to drive for Guglielmo "Mimmo" Dei's Scuderia Centro Sud. At a non-championship race, he finished third at Pau. Bandini drove his first world championship race at Spa later in 1961. He retired with engine failure. During the winter of 1961-1962 he drove in the Tasman races in Australia and New Zealand.

In 1962 Bandini was hired by Ferrari for the 1962 and 1963 seasons, and moved to Maranello, near the team's headquarters. His debut in a works Ferrari at the Monaco Grand Prix, finishing third.

For 1963 Bandini was retained by Ferrari for sports car races only. Along with Ludovico Scarfiotti, he won the Le Mans 24 Hours race and placed second in the Targa Florio that year, occasionally racing in Formula One for Scuderia Centro Sud. His string of good results, including a fifth place at the British Grand Prix, convinced Ferrari to retain him as a Formula One driver as well for the rest of the season.

In 1964 Bandini had his best Formula One season. He won the first Austrian Grand Prix at the Zeltweg circuit and scored two more podiums in Germany and Italy. At the Mexican Grand Prix, Bandini was running second when he decided to let his teammate John Surtees pass, enabling him to score enough points to win the World Championship.

In 1965 Bandini won the Targa Florio.

In 1966 Surtees left Ferrari in mid-season. Bandini was promoted to team leader. He was unlucky not to win the French and US Grands Prix that year which he dominated before mechanical problems intervened while he was holding a huge lead. Bandini's best finish was a second place at the Monaco Grand Prix in a 2.4 liter V-6 Ferrari behind Jackie Stewart's BRM. Later in the season Bandini helped director John Frankenheimer with his movie Grand Prix. Bandini recommended the location at the harbour chicane for a crash scene in the movie filmed at the Monte Carlo circuit. In "The Making of Grand Prix", actress Eva Marie Saint noted that, bitterly, this spot would be the site of Bandini's death in the race one year later.

In 1967 Bandini won the 24 Hours of Daytona and the 1000 km of Monza, both with Chris Amon.

Accident and death

On 7 May 1967 Bandini was racing at the Monaco Grand Prix, running second to Denny Hulme on the 82nd lap, when he lost control of his car at the harbour chicane. He had just entered the chicane when his Ferrari's left rear wheel hit the guard rail, sending him into an erratic skid. It impacted a light pole and overturned. The car hit straw bales which lined the harbour side, rupturing the fuel tank, and sparks ignited the fuel as the car rolled over, with Bandini trapped beneath it. Marshals flipped his car upright and pulled Bandini, unconscious, out from the flaming Ferrari. It is thought that, during the effort to right the overturned car, fuel leaked on the hot brake line or the exhaust pipe and exploded. A second fire occurred when the fuel tank exploded after Bandini had been pulled away from the Ferrari.

Bandini sustained third degree burns covering more than 70% of his body, as well as a chest wound and ten chest fractures. Three days after the crash, Bandini succumbed to his injuries at Princess Grace Polyclinic Hospital in Monte Carlo.

There were concerns about the promptness of Bandini's rescue. However, investigators from the Principality of Monaco ruled on 10 May that "the security operation had functioned properly." The straw bales, having been banned from all Formula One races in response to the accident, were replaced by an extended guard-rail the following year. 

Bandini's funeral was held in Reggiolo on 13 May. 100,000
people attended the funeral. He was later buried in the Lambrate cemetery, in Milan.

In popular culture
Bandini is portrayed by Francesco Bauco in Ford v Ferrari, a 2019 film about the rivalry between Ford and Ferrari at the 1966 Le Mans auto race.

Racing record

Complete Formula One results
(key) (Races in bold indicate pole position; races in italics indicate fastest lap)

Complete Formula One Non-Championship results
(key) (Races in bold indicate pole position)
(Races in italics indicate fastest lap)

Complete 24 Hours of Le Mans results

Complete 12 Hours of Sebring results

Complete 24 Hours of Daytona results

See also
Lorenzo Bandini Trophy

References

External links 
 

1935 births
1967 deaths
Italian racing drivers
Italian Formula One drivers
Ferrari Formula One drivers
Formula One race winners
Scuderia Centro Sud Formula One drivers
North American Racing Team Formula One drivers
24 Hours of Le Mans drivers
24 Hours of Le Mans winning drivers
12 Hours of Reims drivers
24 Hours of Daytona drivers
World Sportscar Championship drivers
Racing drivers who died while racing
Sport deaths in Monaco
Libyan people of Italian descent
Libyan emigrants to Italy